Mauricio Hernán Aquino (born 27 October 1993) is an Argentine professional footballer who plays as a goalkeeper for Colegiales.

Career
Aquino began his career with Independiente Jacinto Arauz, before being signed by Boca Juniors in 2009. In 2014, Aquino completed a move to Arsenal de Sarandí. He was an unused substitute for eleven Argentine Primera División matches between the 2014 and 2016–17 seasons, eventually making his professional debut on 5 May 2018 during a 4–0 victory over Rosario Central. He made three further appearances during the 2017–18 campaign, which Arsenal ended with relegation to Primera B Nacional.

Career statistics
.

References

External links

1993 births
Living people
People from Jacinto Aráuz
Argentine footballers
Association football goalkeepers
Argentine Primera División players
Primera B Metropolitana players
Arsenal de Sarandí footballers
Club Atlético Colegiales (Argentina) players